Ivan Fuštar (born 18 August 1989) is a Croatian professional footballer who plays as a defender for Liga II side FC Brașov.

Club career

Early career
Born in Split, Croatia, Fuštar started his football career in the HNK Hajduk Split academy before moving early to NK Solin, where he debuted for the first team in the Druga HNL in the 2006–07 season. Initially a striker, he moved to the Prva HNL team HNK Šibenik in 2009, where he formed an attacking partnership with Ermin Zec. Initially falling out of favor, he was reinvented as a center back by the coach Vjekoslav Lokica and established himself again as a regular first team player.

In early 2012 he left Šibenik for NK Zadar, spending only half a season there before moving to the Druga HNL team NK Dugopolje. He returned for another 6 months to HNK Šibenik now also in the Druga HNL, but as the team was relegated, he left the club again. In 2013, he joined NK Slaven Belupo in the Prva HNL.

Flamurtari Vlorë
On 27 July 2015, Fuštar joined Albanian Superliga side Flamurtari Vlorë by penning a one-year contract. He made his competitive debut in the opening matchday of the championship as Flamurtari fell to Teuta Durrës 0–1 at home. His first goal in Albania arrived in his 6th appearance for the club in the 7–0 hammering of Tërbuni Pukë. After 13 appearances and 2 goals, Fuštar left the club in January 2016 without noticing them due to unpaid wages, sending a file to FIFA.

RNK Split
In the early days of August 2016, Fuštar returned to his homeland by joining RNK Split on a two-year contract. He left the club in December 2016 after 10 league matches due to the club's bankrupt, becoming a free agent once again.

He trialled for Bruneian professional club DPMM FC in early 2017.

Kamza
On 8 August 2017, Fuštar returned to Albania by signing with newly promoted top flight club Kamza. He made his debut on 9 September by starting in the 1–0 away loss to Kukësi. He asked for his release in the first days of January 2018 after receiving an offer from outside Europe. Fuštar was distinguished for his performances during his spell at Kamzalinjt, making 12 league appearances, all of them as starter, collecting 1022 minutes.

Al-Arabi
On 9 January 2018, Fuštar completed a transfer to Qatar outfit Al-Arabi by penning a contract lasting until the end of the season with an option to renew for another year. He was given squad number 5, and made his debut three days later by playing the entirely of the 1–1 draw at Al-Sailiya.

References

External links
Ivan Fuštar profile at nk-slaven-belupo.hr

1989 births
Living people
Footballers from Split, Croatia
Association football central defenders
Croatian footballers
NK Solin players
HNK Šibenik players
NK Zadar players
NK Dugopolje players
NK Slaven Belupo players
Flamurtari Vlorë players
RNK Split players
FC Kamza players
Al-Arabi SC (Qatar) players
Nea Salamis Famagusta FC players
FC Brașov (2021) players
Croatian Football League players
Kategoria Superiore players
Qatar Stars League players
Liga II players
Croatian expatriate footballers
Expatriate footballers in Albania
Croatian expatriate sportspeople in Albania
Expatriate footballers in Qatar
Croatian expatriate sportspeople in Qatar
Expatriate footballers in Cyprus
Croatian expatriate sportspeople in Cyprus
Expatriate footballers in Romania
Croatian expatriate sportspeople in Romania